Operation Nam is a 1986 Italian-German war film written and directed  by Fabrizio De Angelis (credited as Larry Ludman). It had a sequel, Cobra Mission 2, released in 1988.

Plot
Ten years after the end of the Vietnam War, three American veterans who have never resigned themselves to defeat decided to organize a mission to return to Indochina. Their goal is to liberate the "missing in action", i.e. all those fellow soldiers taken prisoner by the Viet Cong and never let go.

Cast

 Oliver Tobias as Richard Wagner
 Christopher Connelly as Roger Carson 
 Manfred Lehmann as  Mark Adams 
 John Steiner as  James Walcott 
 Ethan Wayne as  Mike 
 Donald Pleasence as  Father Lenoir 
 Gordon Mitchell as  Col. Mortimer  
 Luciano Pigozzi as  Phil Lawson's Father
 Enzo G. Castellari as  Major Morris 
 Thomas Moore

Release
Operation Nam was released in West Germany as Die Rückkehr der Wildgänse on July 31, 1986.

References

External links

1980s war films
Macaroni Combat films
West German films
English-language German films
English-language Italian films
Films directed by Fabrizio De Angelis
Films scored by Francesco De Masi
Vietnam War films
Films shot in the Philippines
1980s Italian films